Bioparco di Sicilia is a zoological garden established in Carini, Sicily, Italy in 1999 as a prehistoric park, over an area of 60,000 square meters.

References

Zoos in Italy
Tourist attractions in Sicily
Parks in Sicily
Buildings and structures in Sicily
Zoos established in 2002
1999 establishments in Italy